African literature  is literature from Africa, either oral ("orature") or written in African and Afro-Asiatic languages. Examples of pre-colonial African literature can be traced back to at least the fourth century AD. The best-known is the Kebra Negast, or "Book of Kings."  

A common theme during the colonial period is the slave narrative, often written in English or French for western audiences.  Among the first pieces of African literature to receive significant worldwide critical acclaim was Things Fall Apart, by Chinua Achebe, published in 1958. African literature in the late colonial period increasingly feature themes of liberation and independence. 

Post-colonial literature has become increasingly diverse, with some writers returning to their native languages. Common themes include the clash between past and present, tradition and modernity, self and community, as well as politics and development. On the whole, female writers are today far better represented in African literature than they were prior to independence. The internet has also changed the landscape of African literature, leading to the rise of digital reading and publishing platforms such as OkadaBooks.

Overview 
As George Joseph notes in his chapter on African Literature in Understanding Contemporary Africa, whereas European views of literature stressed a separation of art and content, African awareness is inclusive and "literature" can also simply mean an artistic use of words for the sake of art alone. Traditionally, Africans do not radically separate art from teaching. Rather than write or sing for beauty in itself, African writers, taking their cue from oral literature, use beauty to help communicate important truths and information to society. An object is considered beautiful because of the truths it reveals and the communities it helps to build.

Oral literature 
Oral literature (or orature, the term coined by Ugandan scholar Pio Zirimu) may be in prose or verse. The prose is often mythological or historical and often includes tales of the trickster character. Storytellers in Africa sometimes use call-and-response techniques to tell their stories. Poetry describes a narrative poem based upon a short and a ribald anecdote and is often sung, through: narrative epic, occupational verse, ritual verse, praise poems of rulers and other prominent people. Praise singers, bards sometimes known as "griots", tell their stories with music. Also recited, often sung, are love songs, work songs, children's songs, along with epigrams, proverbs and riddles. These oral traditions exist in many languages including Fula, Swahili, Hausa, and Wolof.

In Algeria, oral poetry was an important part of Berber traditions when the majority of the population was illiterate. These poems, called Isefra, were used for aspects of both religious and secular life. The religious poems included devotions, prophetic stories, and poems honoring saints. The secular poetry could be about celebrations like births and weddings, or accounts of heroic warriors. As another example, in Mali, oral literature or folktales continue to be broadcast on the radio in the native language Booma.

Precolonial literature 
Examples of pre-colonial African literature are numerous. In Ethiopia, there is a substantial literature written in Ge'ez going back at least to the fourth century AD; the best-known work in this tradition is the Kebra Negast, or "Book of Kings." One popular form of traditional African folktale is the "trickster" story, in which a small animal uses its wits to survive encounters with larger creatures. Examples of animal tricksters include Anansi, a spider in the folklore of the Ashanti people of Ghana; Ijàpá, a tortoise in Yoruba folklore of Nigeria; and Sungura, a hare found in central and East African folklore. Other works in written form are abundant, namely in North Africa, the Sahel regions of west Africa and on the Swahili coast. From Timbuktu alone, there are an estimated 300,000 or more manuscripts tucked away in various libraries and private collections, mostly written in Arabic but some in the native languages (namely Fula and Songhai). Many were written at the famous University of Timbuktu. The material covers a wide array of topics, including astronomy, poetry, law, history, faith, politics, and philosophy. Swahili literature, similarly, draws inspiration from Islamic teachings but developed under indigenous circumstances, one of the most renowned and earliest pieces of Swahili literature being Utendi wa Tambuka or "The Story of Tambuka".

As for the Maghreb, North Africans such as Ibn Khaldun attained great distinction within Arabic literature. Medieval North Africa boasted universities such as those of Fes and Cairo, with copious amounts of literature to supplement them.

Colonial African literature 
The African works best known in the West from the periods of colonization and the slave trade are primarily slave narratives, such as Olaudah Equiano's The Interesting Narrative of the Life of Olaudah Equiano (1789).

In the colonial period, Africans exposed to Western languages began to write in those tongues. In 1911, Joseph Ephraim Casely Hayford (also known as Ekra-Agiman) of the Gold Coast (now Ghana) published what is probably the first African novel written in English, Ethiopia Unbound: Studies in Race Emancipation. Although the work moves between fiction and political advocacy, its publication and positive reviews in the Western press mark a watershed moment in African literature.

During this period, African plays written in English began to emerge. Herbert Isaac Ernest Dhlomo of South Africa published the first English-language African play, The Girl Who Killed to Save: Nongqawuse the Liberator in 1935. In 1962, Ngũgĩ wa Thiong'o of Kenya wrote the first East African drama, The Black Hermit, a cautionary tale about "tribalism" (discrimination between African tribes).

Among the first pieces of African literature to receive significant worldwide critical acclaim was the novel Things Fall Apart, by Chinua Achebe. Published in 1958, late in the colonial era, Things Fall Apart analysed the effect of colonialism on traditional African society.

African literature in the late colonial period (between the end of World War I and independence) increasingly showed themes of liberation, independence, and (among Africans in francophone territories) négritude.  One of the leaders of the négritude movement, the poet and eventual president of Senegal, Léopold Sédar Senghor, published in 1948 the first anthology of French-language poetry written by Africans, Anthologie de la nouvelle poésie nègre et malgache de langue française (Anthology of the New Black and Malagasy Poetry in the French Language), featuring a preface by the French existentialist writer Jean-Paul Sartre.

For many writers this emphasis was not restricted to their publishing. Many, indeed, suffered deeply and directly: censured for casting aside their artistic responsibilities in order to participate actively in warfare, Christopher Okigbo was killed in battle for Biafra against the Nigerian movement of the 1960s' civil war; Mongane Wally Serote was detained under South Africa's Terrorism Act No 83 of 1967 between 1969 and 1970, and subsequently released without ever having stood trial; in London in 1970, his countryman Arthur Norje committed suicide; Malawi's Jack Mapanje was incarcerated with neither charge nor trial because of an off-hand remark at a university pub; and, in 1995, Ken Saro-Wiwa was hanged by the Nigerian junta.

Postcolonial African literature 
With liberation and increased literacy since most African nations gained their independence in the 1950s and 1960s, African literature has grown dramatically in quantity and in recognition, with numerous African works appearing in Western academic curricula and on "best of" lists compiled since the end of the 20th century.  African writers in this period wrote both in Western languages (notably English, French, and Portuguese) and in traditional African languages such as Hausa.

Ali A. Mazrui and others mention seven conflicts as themes: the clash between Africa's past and present, between tradition and modernity, between indigenous and foreign, between individualism and community, between socialism and capitalism, between development and self-reliance and between Africanity and humanity. Other themes in this period include social problems such as corruption, the economic disparities in newly independent countries, and the rights and roles of women.  Female writers are today far better represented in published African literature than they were prior to independence.

In 1986, Nigeria's Wole Soyinka became the first post-independence African writer to win the Nobel Prize in literature. Previously, Algerian-born Albert Camus had been awarded the prize in 1957. Other African Nobel laureates in literature are Naguib Mahfouz (Egypt) in 1988, Nadine Gordimer (South Africa) in 1991, John Maxwell Coetzee (South Africa) in 2003, Doris Lessing (UK/Zimbabwe) in 2007, and Abdulrazak Gurnah (Tanzania) in 2021.

Contemporary developments 
There have been a lot of literary productions in Africa since the beginning of the current decade (2010), even though readers do not always follow in large numbers. One can also notice the appearance of certain writings that break with the academic style. In addition, the shortage of literary critics can be deplored on the continent nowadays. Literary events seem to be very fashionable, including literary awards, some of which can be distinguished by their original concepts. The case of the Grand Prix of Literary Associations is quite illustrative. Brittle Paper, an online platform founded by Ainehi Edoro, has been described as "Africa's leading literary journal". 

The increasing use of the internet has also changed how readers of African literature access content. This has led to the rise of digital reading and publishing platforms like OkadaBooks.

Literature published in Africa 
Inaugurated in 1980 and running until 2009, the Noma Award for Publishing in Africa was presented for outstanding African writers and scholars published in Africa.

Notable novels by African writers 

 Peter Abrahams (South Africa): Mine Boy (1946), This Island Now, A Wreath for Udomo (1956)
 Chinua Achebe (Nigeria): Arrow of God (1964), No Longer At Ease (1960), Things Fall Apart (1958), A Man of the People (1966), Anthills of the Savannah (1987),  
 Chimamanda Ngozi Adichie (Nigeria): Purple Hibiscus (2003), Half of a Yellow Sun (2006), Americanah (2013)
 Chigozie Obioma (Nigeria): The Fishermen (2015), An Orchestra of Minorities (2019) 
 José Eduardo Agualusa (Angola): Rainy Season, Creole, The Book of Chameleons, My Father's Wives
 Ama Ata Aidoo (Ghana): Our Sister Killjoy (1977), Changes: a Love Story (1991)

 Germano Almeida (Cape Verde): O dia das calças roladas (1982), The Last Will and Testament of Senhor da Silva Araújo
 Elechi Amadi (Nigeria): The Concubine (1966), The Great Ponds, Sunset in Biafra
 Ayi Kwei Armah (Ghana): The Beautyful Ones Are Not Yet Born (1968), Two Thousand Seasons (1973)
 Sefi Atta (Nigeria): Everything Good Will Come (2005)
 Ayesha Harruna Attah (Ghana): Harmattan Rain
 Mariama Bâ (Senegal): Une si longue lettre (So Long a Letter)
 Chris Barnard (South Africa): Bundu, Mahala
 Ishmael Beah (Sierra Leone): A Long Way Gone (2007), Radiance of Tomorrow
 Mongo Beti (Cameroon): Poor Christ of Bomba (1956 as Le Pauvre Christ de Bomba)
 André Brink (South Africa): 'n Droe Wit Seisoen (A Dry White Season), Gerugte van Reen (Rumours of Rain)
 J. M. Coetzee (South Africa): Disgrace (1999), Life & Times of Michael K (1983)
 Mia Couto (Mozambique): Terra Sonâmbula (Sleepwalking Land)
 Ungulani Ba Ka Khosa (Mozambique): Ualalapi (1987)
 Luís Bernardo Honwana (Mozambique): Nós Matamos O Cão-Tinhoso e Outros Contos, We Killed Mangy Dog and Other Stories (1964)
 Tsitsi Dangarembga (Zimbabwe): Nervous Conditions (1988), The Book of Not (2006), This Mournable Body
 Mohammed Dib (Algeria): La grande maison
 E. K. M. Dido (South Africa): 'n Stringetjie Blou Krale (A String of Blue Beads), Die Storie van Monica Peters (The Story of Monica Peters)
 Assia Djebar (Algeria): Les Enfants du Nouveau Monde
 K. Sello Duiker (South Africa): Thirteen Cents (2000), The Quiet Violence of Dreams
 Buchi Emecheta (Nigeria): The Bride Price (1976), The Slave Girl (1977), The Joys of Motherhood (1979), Destination Biafra (1982)
 Daniel Olorunfemi Fagunwa (Nigeria): Ogboju odẹ ninu igbo irunmalẹ (The Forest of a Thousand Demons)
 Nuruddin Farah (Somalia): From a Crooked Rib (1970), Maps, Sweet and Sour Milk
 Athol Fugard (South Africa): Tsotsi
 Nadine Gordimer (South Africa): Burger's Daughter (1979), The Conservationist (1974), July's People (1981)
 Alex La Guma (South Africa): In the Fog of the Seasons' End (1972), The Stone-Country (1967), Time of the Butcherbird (1979), A Walk in the Night (2020)
 Abdulrazak Gurnah (Tanzania): Paradise (1994), By the Sea (2001), Afterlives (2020)
 Bessie Head (Botswana): When Rain Clouds Gather (1968), Maru (1971), A Question of Power (1973)
 Moses Isegawa (Uganda): Abyssinian Chronicles (1998)
 Rayda Jacobs (South Africa): The Slave Book, Eyes of the Sky, Confessions of a Gambler
 Tahar Ben Jelloun (Morocco): The Sacred Night, The Sand Child (1985), This Blinding Absence of Light (2001)
 Cheikh Hamidou Kane (Senegal): L'Aventure ambiguë (1961)
 Malama Katulwende (Zambia): Bitterness
 Yasmina Khadra (Algeria): The Swallows of Kabul (2002)
 Christopher Zacharia Lameck (Tanzania): The Mythical Father,  Lost, Ztraceni European Madness, 
 Camara Laye (Guinea): The African Child (L'Enfant noir, 1953), The Radiance of the King (1954)
 Naguib Mahfouz (Egypt): The Beginning and the End (1949), Cairo Trilogy, Children of Gebelawi, Midaq Alley
 Charles Mangua (Kenya): Son of Woman (1971), A Tail in the Mouth
 Sarah Ladipo Manyika (Nigeria): In Dependence (2008)
 Dambudzo Marechera (Zimbabwe): The House of Hunger (1978)
 Dalene Matthee (South Africa): Kringe in 'n bos (Circles in a Forest)
 Zakes Mda (South Africa): Ways of Dying (1995), The Heart of Redness
 Thomas Mofolo (South Africa/Lesotho): Chaka (1925)
 Nadifa Mohamed (Somalia) Black Mamba Boy (2010), The Orchard of Lost Souls (2013), The Fortune Men (2021)
 Bai Tamia Moore (Liberia): Murder in the Cassava Patch (1968)
 Fadhy Mtanga (Tanzania): Kizungumkuti,   Huba, Fungate
 Meja Mwangi (Kenya): Carcase for Hounds (1974), Going Down River Road, Kill Me Quick (1973)
 Ngũgĩ wa Thiong'o (Kenya): A Grain of Wheat (1967), Matigari (1986), Petals of Blood (1977), Weep Not, Child (1964), Wizard of the Crow (2006)
 Lewis Nkosi (South Africa): Mandela's Ego (2006), Mating Birds (1986), Underground People (2002)
 Flora Nwapa (Nigeria): Efuru (1966), Idu (1970), One is Enough, Never Again, Women are Different
 Nnedi Okorafor (Nigeria): Zahrah the Windseeker (2005)
 Ben Okri (Nigeria): The Famished Road (1991), Songs of Enchantment (1993)
 Deon Opperman (South Africa): Donkerland (Dark Land), Kruispad (Crossroad), Hartland (Heartland)
 Yambo Ouologuem (Mali): Le Devoir de Violence (Bound to Violence)
 Alan Paton (South Africa): Cry, The Beloved Country (1948)
 Pepetela (Angola) : Muana Puó, Mayombe, A Gloriosa Família (1997)
 Sol Plaatje (South Africa): Mhudi (1930)
 Nawal El Saadawi (Egypt): Woman at Point Zero (1975)
 Tayeb Salih (Sudan): Season of Migration to the North (1966)
 Wilton Sankawulo (Liberia): Birds Are Singing
 Karel Schoeman (South Africa): n Ander Land (Another Country), Na die Geliefde Land (Promised Land)
 Olive Schreiner (South Africa): The Story of an African Farm (1883)
 Benjamin Sehene (Rwanda): Le Feu sous la Soutane (Fire under the Cassock)
 Ousmane Sembène (Senegal): Xala (1973), The Black Docker (Le Docker Noir), God's Bits of Wood (Les Bouts de Bois de Dieu), The Last of the Empire (Le dernier de l'Empire), Tribal Scars (Voltaïque), (1962)
 Wole Soyinka (Nigeria): The Interpreters (1965), Seasons of Anomy (1973), Chronicles from the Land of the Happiest People on Earth (2021)
 Amos Tutuola (Nigeria): The Palm Wine Drinkard (1952), My Life in the Bush of Ghosts (1954), Simbi and the Satyr of the Dark Jungle, Feather Woman of the Jungle, The Witch-Herbalist of the Remote Town, Ajaiyi and his Inherited Poverty
 Marlene van Niekerk (South Africa): Triomf (Triumph, 1994)
 Yvonne Vera (Zimbabwe): Butterfly Burning (1998) 
 José Luandino Vieira (Angola): Luuanda (1963) 
 Joseph Jeffrey Walters (Liberia): Guanya Pau: A Story of an African Princess (1891)
 Berhanu Zerihun (Ethiopia): Ye'imba debdabbéwoch ("Tearful Letters")

Notable African poets 

 Chinua Achebe (Nigeria)
 Ama Ata Aidoo (Ghana)
 Jared Angira (Kenya)
 Kofi Anyidoho (Ghana)
 Kofi Awoonor  (Ghana)
 Fadhy Mtanga (Tanzania)
 Breyten Breytenbach (South Africa)
 Dennis Brutus (South Africa)
 Abena Busia (Ghana)
 John Pepper Clark (Nigeria)
 José Craveirinha (Mozambique)
 Viriato Clemente da Cruz (Angola)
 Hadraawi (Somalia)
 Ingrid Jonker (South Africa)
 Jonathan Kariara (Kenya)
 Susan Kiguli (Uganda)
 Ahmadou Kourouma (Ivory Coast)
 Antjie Krog (South Africa)
 Mumbi Macharia (Kenya)
 Jack Mapanje (Malawi)
 Eugene Marais (South Africa)
 Don Mattera (South Africa)
 Bai Tamia Moore (Liberia)
 Micere Githae Mugo (Kenya)
 Togara Muzanenhamo (Zimbabwe)
 Christopher Mwashinga (Tanzania)
 Arthur Nortje (South Africa)
 Gabriel Okara (Nigeria)
 Nii Parkes (Ghana)
 Christopher Okigbo (Nigeria)
 Ben Okri (Nigeria)
 Marjorie Oludhe Macgoye (Kenya)
 Okot p'Bitek (Uganda)
 Lenrie Peters (Gambia)
 Jean-Joseph Rabearivelo (Madagascar)
 Jacques Rabemananjara (Madagascar)
 Elie Rajaonarison (Madagascar)
 Ny Avana Ramanantoanina (Madagascar)
 Jean Verdi Salomon Razakandraina (Dox) (Madagascar)
 David Rubadiri (Malawi, Uganda)
 Tijan Sallah (Gambia)
 Dina Salústio (Cabo Verde)
 Léopold Sédar Senghor (Senegal)
 Bewketu Seyoum (Ethiopia)
 Warsan Shire
 Adam Small (South Africa)
 Wole Soyinka (Nigeria)
 Véronique Tadjo (Ivory Coast)
 Arménio Vieira (Cape Verde)
 Patricia Jabbeh Wesley (Liberia)

See also 

 Grand Prix of Literary Associations
 List of African writers by country
 List of African novelists
 Literature by country
 African cinema
 Poetry in Africa
 Nigerian literature
 International Research Confederacy on African Literature and Culture
 African-American literature
 Asian literature
 European literature
 Oceanian literature
 Latin-American literature
 Liberian literature
 African language material archive
 The Journal of Commonwealth Literature

References

Bibliography 

 Werku, Dagnachew, The Thirteenth Sun, 1968.
 Berhanemariam, Sahlesillasse, The Warrior King, 1974.
 
 
Busby, Margaret (ed.), Daughters of Africa: An International Anthology of Words and Writings by Women of African Descent from the Ancient Egyptian to the Present, Jonathan Cape, 1992.
 Mazrui, Ali A. (ed.), General History of Africa, vol. VIII, UNESCO, 1993, ch. 19, Ali A. Mazrui et al., "The development of modern literature since 1935". 
 Gordon, April A., and Donald L. Gordon, Understanding Contemporary Africa, London: Lynne Rienner, 1996, ch. 12, George Joseph, "African Literature". 
 Gikandi, Simon (ed.), Encyclopedia of African Literature, London: Routledge, 2003.
Irele, Abiola, and Simon Gikandi (eds),The Cambridge History of African and Caribbean Literature, 2 vols, Cambridge [u.a.]: Cambridge University Press, 2004. Table of contents
Shamim, Amna. Gynocentric Contours of the Male Imagination: A Study of the Novels of Chinua Achebe and Ngugi wa Thiong'o. New Delhi: Idea  Publishing, 2017. 
Marvin x. Black theatre: a periodical of the black theatre movement, New York: 1994

External links

Things We Inherited: Voices from Africa Cordite Poetry Review
New African Literature resource
The Africa_(Bookshelf) at Project Gutenberg
African Literature Association
African Literature Reviews 
 (Bibliography)

 
Literature